Tunku Zain Al-'Abidin ibni Tuanku Muhriz (born 6 July 1982), more popularly known as Tunku 'Abidin Muhriz, is the second son of the reigning Yang di-Pertuan Besar of Negeri Sembilan in Malaysia, Tuanku Muhriz ibni Almarhum Tuanku Munawir and the reigning Tunku Ampuan Besar of Negeri Sembilan, Tuanku Aishah Rohani binti Tengku Besar Mahmud. He is the Founding President of the Institute for Democracy and Economic Affairs (IDEAS), Malaysia and is a trustee of Yayasan Chow Kit along with Yayasan Munarah.

Family 
Tunku Zain Al-'Abidin was born on 6 July 1982 at University Hospital, Petaling Jaya, Selangor, as second son and child of Tuanku Muhriz ibni Almarhum Tuanku Munawir (now the reigning Yang di-Pertuan Besar of Negeri Sembilan) and Tuanku Aishah Rohani.

His siblings are :
 Tunku Ali Redhauddin, Tunku Besar Seri Menanti (born 26 April 1977)
 Tunku Alif Hussein (born 3 September 1984; died 15 January 2016)

Education
He was educated at :
 Alice Smith School, Kuala Lumpur
 Marlborough College, Wiltshire, United Kingdom 
 London School of Economics and Political Science, where he obtained his BSc in Government and Sociology and MSc in Comparative Politics and Imperial History.

Career

Philanthropy 
He is the Pro-Chancellor of UCSI University, a Trustee of Yayasan Munarah, Yayasan Chow Kit and the Jeffrey Cheah Foundation, Founding President of the Institute for Democracy and Economic Affairs (IDEAS) and is an Honorary Major in the Malaysian Territorial Army. In his various roles he has been interviewed for numerous television programmes, magazines and newspaper features; he is particular a regular columnist for major newspaper The Star since 2018.

Involvement in arts
Tunku 'Abidin is greatly interested in music and is an accomplished pianist. He is the patron for the Euroasia Association of Performing Arts or Euroasia, and regularly supports the organisation's efforts to develop and share music education and performance. Tunku 'Abidin has also performed at the Konsert Diraja UKM (National University of Malaysia Royal Concert) for the past several years. He is the first patron of Hands Percussion, a Malaysian percussion ensemble.

In conjunction with his father's Installation Ceremony he wrote a book about the state's history and customs, and began a major project composing a new rendition for his state's anthem, Berkatlah Yang di-Pertuan Besar Negeri Sembilan, with the Malaysian Philharmonic Orchestra. This new composition was officially launched on 26 October 2010.

Bibliography
He has authored four books to date:

 Muhriz, Zain Al-’Abidin. Payung Berdaulat Warisan Beradat: Istiadat Pertabalan Duli Yang Maha Mulia Yang Di-Pertuan Besar Negeri Sembilan Darul Khusus Tuanku Muhriz Ibni Almarhum Tuanku Munawir... Seremban, Istana Negeri Sembilan, 2009.
 Muhriz, Zain Al-’Abidin. Abiding Times. Vol. 1, Singapore, Marshall Cavendish Editions ; Tarrytown, N.Y., USA, 2011. .
 Muhriz, Zain Al-’Abidin. Abiding Times 2 : An Insight into the Minds of Malaysia's Thinking Youth. Vol. 2, Singapore, Marshall Cavendish Editions, 2012. .
 Muhriz, Zain Al-’Abidin. Roaming Beyond the Fence. Didier Millet Csi, 2014. .

Honours

  Recipient of the Royal Family Order of Yam Tuan Radin Sunnah (DKYR, 20 October 2009)
 Grand Knight of the Most Conspicuous Loyal Order of Tuanku Muhriz (SSTM, 14 January 2018)

Ancestry

References

Royal House of Negeri Sembilan
Living people
1982 births
People from Selangor
Malaysian Muslims
Malaysian male writers
Malaysian people of Malay descent
Malaysian people of Minangkabau descent
People educated at Marlborough College
Alumni of the London School of Economics
Sons of monarchs